Captain Edward Henry Columbine (2 July 1763 – 18 June 1811) was an English naval officer and hydrographer who served as Governor of Sierra Leone from 12 February 1810 – May 1811.

Columbine was given command of HMS Resolution in 1792–1796 and participated in the Battle of Genoa, 14 March 1795.

Columbine had already been appointed alongside William Dawes and Thomas Ludlam to carry out a review of the forts and Settlements in British West Africa when Lord Castlereagh asked him to take over a governor of Sierra Leone from Thomas Perronet Thompson. Whilst Dawes and Ludlam proceeded to inspect settlements along the West African Coast, Columbine stayed in Sierra Leone to deal with the colonies affairs.

References

Royal Navy officers
English hydrographers
Officers of the West Africa Squadron